Raggen or Raggen – That's Me (Swedish: Raggen - det är jag det) is a 1936 Swedish comedy film directed by Schamyl Bauman and starring Nils Wahlbom, Anna Olin and Isa Quensel. It was shot at the Sundbyberg Studios in Stockholm and on location in Paris. The film's sets were designed by the art director Bibi Lindström.

Cast
 Nils Wahlbom as 	H. Winroth
 Anna Olin as 	Mrs. Winroth
 Isa Quensel as 	Maria alias Raggen
 Solveig Hedengran as 	Stina
 Sally Palmblad as 	Hedvig / Nora
 Britt Nordborg as 	Magda
 Gerd Nordborg as 	Sofia
 Nils Lundell as 	Olle Berglind
 Margit Andelius as 	Pyret
 Aino Taube as Josephine Baker
 Anna-Stina Wåglund as 	Margareta
 Fritiof Billquist as 	Per-Lennart Lundblad
 Karin Ahldén as 	Ninni Nyman
 Astrid Bodin as Hat Check Girl
 Hartwig Fock as Bernhard Lundkvist
 Helge Hagerman as Gustaf
 Anki Kleist as Crazed Shrew
 Einar Lindström as 	Gustaf Adolf Nilsson
 Robert Ryberg as 	Guest at the club in Paris
 Ilse-Nore Tromm as Dancing woman in Paris
 Carl-Gunnar Wingård as 	Consul Westerlund

References

Bibliography 
 Per Olov Qvist & Peter von Bagh. Guide to the Cinema of Sweden and Finland. Greenwood Publishing Group, 2000.

External links 
 

1936 films
1936 comedy films
Swedish comedy films
1930s Swedish-language films
Films directed by Schamyl Bauman
Films set in Paris
1930s Swedish films